Phil Noble Jr. (born May 17, 1951, Greenville, South Carolina) is an American entrepreneur and speaker in technology and the civic sector.

Biography
Growing up in Anniston, Alabama, Noble's father, J. Phillips Noble, a Presbyterian minister, was involved in the civil rights movement during Gov. George Wallace’s tenure as Alabama governor.  FBI files indicate Noble's father was a top target of the Alabama Ku Klux Klan.

After graduating from Tennessee Military Institute in 1969, Noble attended several colleges and universities, graduating from Birmingham-Southern College in 1974.

Working in politics and technology

For his work, in 2001, Noble was chosen as a Resident Fellow of the Harvard Institute of Politics of the John F. Kennedy School of Government at Harvard University.

Noble was a Democratic candidate in the 2018 South Carolina Gubernatorial Election. He chose Gloria Bromell Tinubu as his running mate. James Smith ultimately won the Democratic Nomination.

References

External links
 PoliticsOnline
 Palmetto Project

1951 births
Living people
People from Greenville, South Carolina
People from Anniston, Alabama
South Carolina Democrats
American political consultants
Birmingham–Southern College alumni
Businesspeople from South Carolina
Harvard Kennedy School people